Kansas's 20th Senate district is one of 40 districts in the Kansas Senate. It has been represented by Republican Eric Rucker since his appointment in 2018 to replace fellow Republican Vicki Schmidt; Rucker was defeated in the 2020 primary election by State Representative Brenda Dietrich.

Geography
District 20 is based in southern Topeka, also stretching to cover sparsely populated portions of Shawnee and Wabaunsee Counties.

The district is located almost entirely within Kansas's 2nd congressional district, with a small portion extending into the 1st district. It overlaps with the 50th, 51st, 52nd, 53rd, 54th, 55th, and 56th districts of the Kansas House of Representatives.

Recent election results

2020
In 2018, incumbent Vicki Schmidt was elected Kansas Insurance Commissioner, and Assistant Secretary of State Eric Rucker was chosen to replace her.

2016

2012

Federal and statewide results in District 20

References

20
Shawnee County, Kansas
Wabaunsee County, Kansas